In the 2008–09 season of competitive football (soccer) in Cape Verde The 2nd Cape Verdean Cup took place in July and August.

Diary of the season
Boa Vista Island Cup held their first edition
October 8: Cutelinho FC celebrated its 25th anniversary
Tchadense celebrated its 25th anniversary of the foundation of the club
February 9: Sanjoanense of Ribeira das Pratas celebrated its 25th anniversary
Académica Operária won their 15th title  for Boa Vista
SC Morabeza won their 4th title for Brava
Vulcânicos won their 7th title for Fogo
Onze Unidos won their 8th title for Maio
SC Santa Maria won their 6th and recent title for Sal
Estrela dos Amadores won their 2nd title for Santiago North
Académica da Praia won their only title for Santiago South
Os Foguetões won their only title Santo Antão North
Sporting Clube do Porto Novo won their 3rd and recent title for Santo Antão South
FC Ultramarina won their 8th title for São Nicolau
CS Mindelense won their 45th title for São Vicente
April 16: 2009 Cape Verdean Football Championships began
June 6: Mindelense defeated Os Foguetões 6-0 and made it the national championship's highest scoring match
June 13: Mindelense, Sportings Praia and Porto Novo and Académica Praia
July 6: Académico 83 do Porto Inglês celebrated its 25th anniversary
June 20: Knockout stage begins
July 4: Championship finals begins, it was the first final competition that featured two clubs from the same island as well as the same city
July 11: Sporting Clube da Praia won their 8th national championship title

Final standings

Cape Verdean Football Championships

Académica and Sporting  Praia were first in each group while  Mindelense and Sporting Porto Novo, second of each group.  Académica Praia had the most points second were Mindelense and Sporting Praia with 12.  Mindelense scored the most with 13 goals followed by Sporting Praia and Ultramarina with eleven, Académica Praia with ten and Sporting Porto Novo with nine. Later, Académica Praia advanced with four goals scored while Sporting Advanced with three. Sporting won the first match 2-0, the second leg had a goal draw, with a total of three goals, Sporting Praia claimed their 8th national title.

Group A

Group B

Final Stages

Leading goalscorer: Kadú - 9 goals

Cape Verdean Cup
The second Cape Verdean Cup took place.  Boavista Praia won their first cup title after defeating Académico do Aeroporto 1-0 in the final.

Participants
Sport Sal Rei Club, winner of the Boa Vista Island Cup
Académico do Aeroporto, winner of the Sal Island Cup
Beira-Mar, winner of the Santo Antão North Cup
Belo Horizonte, winner of the São Nicolau Cup
Batuque, winner of the São Vicente Cup

Island or regional competitions

Regional Championships

Regional Cups

Regional Super Cups
The 2008 champion winner played with a 2008 cup winner (when a club won both, a second place club competed).

Regional Opening Tournaments

Famous debutant
 Rambé, 18 year old striker who first participated for Batuque FC

Transfer deals
 Babanco from Sporting Praia to Boavista Praia
 Figo from Académica da Praia to Amabox Barcelona Tarrafal
 Kuca from AD Bairro to Boavista Praia
 Rambé from Batuque FC to CS Mindelense
 Tom Tavares from Estrela dos Amadores to Sporting Praia

See also
2008 in Cape Verde
2009 in Cape Verde
Timeline of Cape Verdean football

References

 
 
2008 in association football
2009 in association football